The Norwich State Hospital, originally established as Norwich State Hospital for the Insane and later shortened to Norwich Hospital, was a psychiatric hospital that is located in Preston and Norwich, Connecticut. It opened its doors in October 1904 and it remained operational until October 10, 1996. Throughout its years of operation, it housed geriatric patients, chemically dependent patients and, from 1931 to 1939, tubercular patients.

A  property including the hospital was listed as an historic district on the National Register of Historic Places in 1988.

History

Development of the grounds
In October, 1904 when the hospital first opened, it held 95 patients and was a single building.  The facility quickly outgrew its meager beginnings, and by fall of 1905, it held 151 patients and had expanded its housing by adding two additional buildings. The original building was soon converted to administrative offices. In 1907, a third patient building was opened, and over the next eight years, there would be the addition of thirteen structures to the grounds.  The hospital began to branch out, no longer creating housing intended only for patients, but for hospital physicians, a laboratory, an employees club, a main kitchen and various other structures to support the every-day workings of the hospital.  Like most mental hospitals at that time, it was self-sufficient, a barn, two garages, a paint shop and a greenhouse were also added.  By the end of the 1930s, over twenty buildings had been added to the grounds.

To provide an identification system, each building was originally assigned a letter name. The original campus had ward buildings grouped in pairs and designated as "North" for female patients or "South" for male patients. Around 1940, each building was given a name in honor of the founding superintendents of the American Psychiatric Association and well-known mental health advocates such as Thomas Story Kirkbride and Dorothea Dix. Later buildings were named after recognized contributors to the hospital, including Connecticut governors Abraham Ribicoff and John Davis Lodge. The Ronald H. Kettle Center opened in 1960 as the new medical-surgical facility and was the largest building on the property. Built like a general hospital, it reflected the then-modern belief that mental illness could be treated biologically on a short-term stay, thus reducing the need for antiquated long-term care wards. The Ribicoff Research Center was built perpendicular to Kettle to facilitate the discovery of new treatment techniques. Gradually, as the number of patients and employees began to decrease, when a new structure was built, an older one would be closed, and by the early 1970s, only 7 of the original buildings were still in use, the others used for either storage or abandoned completely. As the process of deinstitutionalization progressed, a new law required all patients' cases to be reviewed every two years. This, along with threats of strike from the union, lead to the hospital vacating many more of its buildings in 1979. By the time the hospital closed in 1996, only a fraction of the campus was still operating. All patients were now housed in the Kettle building along with geriatric patients in Seymour. The Gallup building continued to house the Boneski Treatment Center for chemical dependency, and other buildings still in use up to closure included Administration, Lodge, Russell, Ribicoff, the chapel, utility buildings, and employee housing facilities across the street.

Due to the large number to structures and the hundreds of acres they stood on, the majority of buildings were connected by a series of underground passageways.  The main purpose of these tunnels were for the utilities, however, they were often used to transport patients from one area to another. In the mid 2000's, the tunnels became a means of transportation for trespassers who hope to explore the grounds of the hospital undetected by the security officers who have been hired by the state to patrol the vacant site. However, more recently the tunnels have been caved in and removed by construction crews preparing the site for the Preston Riverwalk project.

Timeline of changes and patient census (1904 to 1996)
1904-Established as Norwich State Hospital for the Insane, patient population was 95
1904-Henry M. Pollock, M.D. became Superintendent
1905-Establishment of a training school for nurses
1913-Patient population was 998
1916-Patient population was 1,227
1917-Franklin Wilcox, M.D. became Superintendent
1918-Patient population was 1,231
1920-Patient population was 1,341
1926-Name was changed to Norwich State Hospital
1928-Elijah S. Burdsall, M.D. became Superintendent
1929-Patient population was 2,175
1930-Patient population was 2,422, training school for nurses closed due to inability to meet the standards of the State Board of Nurse Examiners
1934-Chester A. Waterman, M.D. became Superintendent
1939-Patient population was 2,918.
1939-Governor Baldwin and the State Legislature form the Commission on the Treatment and Care of People Afflicted with Physical or Mental Disabilities. First order of business was the investigation of conditions at Norwich State Hospital.
1940-William A. Bryan, M.D. became Superintendent
1941-For the first time since opening, discharges of patients (917) exceeded the admissions of patients (626)
1942-Superintendent Bryan responds to the staffing crisis during World War II by using conscientious objectors 
1942-Superintendent Bryan employs selected patients to serve as "patient attendants" during World War II 
1945-Riley H. Guthrie, M.D. became Superintendent
1948-Ronald H. Kettle, M.D. became Superintendent
1953-Administratively transferred to the Department of Mental Health
1955-Patient population was 3,184 (highest annual average in hospital's history)
1960-Patient population was 2,685
1961-Renamed Norwich Hospital
1966-Morgan Martin, M.D. became Superintendent
1972-Patient population was 1,148
1978-Francis K. Hayes, M.D. became Superintendent
1984-Luigi Saracino became Superintendent
1985-Garrell S. Mullaney became Superintendent
1988-National Register of Historic Places listing
1994-Total beds were 649
1996-Andrew S. Phillips became Superintendent
1996-Norwich Hospital was officially closed and remaining patients were transferred to Connecticut Valley Hospital

Facilities

Hospital Buildings

Patient Ward Buildings

 Fifteen physician's cottages, a power house, kitchen, and laundry building were constructed in the 1950s.
 Numerous cottages, a trade school, firehouse, carpenter and maintenance shop, club house, staff house, greenhouse, and garages were constructed on the campus.
 Numerous farm buildings were demolished in the 1970s after the hospital discontinued its agricultural therapy.

Legacy
The hospital was listed on the National Register in 1988.  The NRHP listing included 40 contributing buildings and two contributing structures on 70 acres.  It includes work by architects Cudworth & Woodworth.  It includes Colonial Revival and Late Gothic Revival architecture.

The district was deemed historically significant as illustrating a historic view of mental health treatment.

In 1996, when Norwich State Hospital was closed, the State Department of Public Works (DPW) became responsible for the property. Both towns were given three years to close the transfer of the property.

In March, 2009, the town of Preston purchased  of the property offered to them by the state.  In spring of 2009, the Preston Redevelopment Agency was created to oversee the development of the newly acquired property.  According to the sale agreement, the state would provide for the security presence, maintenance and insurance of the property until March, 2010, at which point the town of Preston would take responsibility for the cost of these, as well as begin the property cleanup.

Proposals
Since the DPW first made an offer to the town of Preston to purchase a portion of the Norwich State Hospital, several proposals have been submitted for the use of the property.  One of the earliest proposals was submitted by Utopia Studios, and was approved in May 2006. Utopia promised an entertainment complex consisting of a theme park, 4,200 hotel rooms, a performing arts school and a movie studio.  The projected cost of this project was around $1.6 billion and was viewed favorably by the voters.  However, in November of the same year, the proposal was canceled by the town due to Utopia missing several key deadlines and, most importantly, failing to place $53 million in escrow as agreed.

In 2008, two developers, Northlang Investment Corporation and Preston Gateway Partners LLC, sought for approval to develop the land.  The town accepted Northland's proposal for a billion-dollar luxury resort, but in November 2008, this plan was ended as well.  Since then, eight additional developers have submitted proposals to develop the property, but as of March 2010 no agreement has been reached.

The property, which has become known as the Preston Riverwalk, had been considered for a project by the town's parks and recreation department.  This would have included a public access park for bird-watching, fishing and various other outdoor activities.  On May 13, 2016, the Mohegan Tribe reached an agreement with Town of Preston to purchase the land.  According to the Hartford Courant, the land will be used "for office, retail, entertainment, recreation and possibly housing."  It will not become tribal land, meaning that whatever is built there will be a source of state and local tax revenue.

Demolition
The Norwich State Hospital is listed on both the state and national historic register as a place of architectural and historical significance and thus many of the buildings, grounds, and infrastructure can not be removed (or even cleaned of medical waste material) without exception from both state and federal historical authorities. Nonetheless, demolition of the property started in spring of 2011 with the collapse of the tunnels surrounding Administration. Later that year, Salmon, Awl, and the cafeteria-theater buildings were demolished, followed by Ribicoff, the power plant, chapel, and a few cottages in 2012. Demolition of the site was ongoing in November 2014; the exposed interior including the stairwell of the Kettle building was featured in The Day.

As of August 2021, all buildings on the Preston side of the campus have been demolished except for the Ray, Gallup, and Mitchell building(s). All interior roadways were stripped of asphalt mid-late 2018 and major excavation commenced near the site of the Lodge building. The Administration Building has been weatherized and buttoned up to prevent further decay and will be saved for future development. The presence of buried coal ash was discovered in 2020, which acquired the need for more funding to complete cleanup. As of March 2022, progress was continuing on the demolition, with the Pathway House being up next for remediation and demolition.

TV appearances
Episodes two and four of season one of VH1's Celebrity Paranormal Project were filmed at the mental hospital though most likely to protect the place it was referred to as Warson Asylum for the Criminally Insane during both episodes.

The Norwich State Hospital was featured in the TV series Life After People, in the episode titled "Crypt of Civilization", which aired on January 19, 2010.

Syfy Channel's Ghost Hunters paranormal investigating team explored the location in their sixth season which aired May 5, 2010.

See also
National Register of Historic Places listings in New London County, Connecticut

References

External links

Extensive documentation of abandoned campus
Salmon (male forensic) building Photoessay on the building reserved for male patients deemed "not guilty by reason of insanity" in court.
Beautiful photographs from Norwich State Hospital (2007)
Exploration Photos at EastGhost
Research into Norwich State Hospital by individual with four ancestors who were patients at the hospital
Rockledge, Christine. Norwich State Hospital.  Introduction by Steve DePolito.  Mt. Pleasant: SC:  Arcadia Publishing, 2018.  Images of America series.

1905 establishments in Connecticut
Government buildings completed in 1904
Psychiatric hospitals in Connecticut
Reportedly haunted locations in Connecticut
Preston, Connecticut
Hospitals established in 1905
Defunct hospitals in Connecticut
Unused buildings in Connecticut
Buildings and structures in Norwich, Connecticut
National Register of Historic Places in New London County, Connecticut
Colonial Revival architecture in Connecticut
Gothic Revival architecture in Connecticut
Hospital buildings on the National Register of Historic Places in Connecticut
Government buildings on the National Register of Historic Places in Connecticut
Historic districts on the National Register of Historic Places in Connecticut